Veladi may refer to:
 Velədi, Azerbaijan